Strange Moosic is a 2011 studio album by Herman Düne. A video made for the album starred Jon Hamm and a blue yeti-esque creature.

Critical reception
The Guardian wrote: "Innocent indie pop with a dash of wit is still this duo's raison d'être and they do it wonderfully well on Strange Moosic." BBCs Garry Mulholland gave the album a favourable review and named it their best album.

Track list 
 Tell Me Something I Don't Know – 3:35
 Ah Hears Strange Moosic – 3:39
 Be a Doll and Take My Heart – 3:02
 Where Is the Man? – 3:07
 Lay Your Head on My Chest – 3:57
 Monument Park – 2:27
 In the Long Long Run – 5:00
 Your Love Is Gold – 2:41
 The Rock – 3:52
 Just Like Summer – 4:02
 My Joy – 2:02
 Magician – 3:41

References

External links 
 Official website for Herman Düne

2011 albums
Herman Dune albums